The Canadian Figure Skating Championships is a figure skating competition held annually to crown the national champions of Canada. It is organized by Skate Canada, the nation's figure skating governing body. Medals may be awarded in the disciplines of men's singles, ladies' singles, pair skating, and ice dancing on the senior, junior, and novice levels.

The competition's results are among the criteria used to determine the Canadian teams to the World Championships, World Junior Championships, and Four Continents Championships, as well as the Canadian national team.

History
Unofficial Canadian national championships were first held in 1905. The first official competition took place in 1914. Junior categories were added in 1928 and novice in 1966. No competition was held in 1907 and 1909, and from 1915 through 1919 due to the First World War. Due to the Second World War, no senior events took place in 1943 and women's singles was the only senior-level discipline held in 1944.

At the 1959 Canadian Figure Skating Association (now Skate Canada) Annual Meeting, the Waltz and Tenstep competitions were discontinued and their championship cups were retired. Competition in the Fours discipline was held irregularly, with the final competition taking place in 1997.

The Canadian Synchronized Skating Championships began in 1983.

Senior medalists

Men

Women

Pairs

Ice dancing

Junior medalists

Men

Women

Pairs

Ice dancing

Novice medalists

Men

Women

Pairs

Ice dancing

Discontinued events

These events were held only in the years indicated.

Fours

Waltz

Tenstep

Fourteenstep

References

External links
 Skate Canada
 Canadian National Figure Skating Championships

 
Figure skating national championships
Figure skating in Canada
Recurring sporting events established in 1905
1905 establishments in Canada